Ondagi Balu is a 1989 Indian Kannada-language film, directed by K. S. R. Das and produced by Vijaya Shankar Bhat. The film stars Vishnuvardhan, Manjula Sharma, Avinash and Aruna. The film has musical score by Vijayanand. It is a remake of Hindi film Do Raaste.

Cast

Vishnuvardhan
Rajesh
Manjula Sharma
Sumithra
Avinash
Aruna
Pandari Bai
Aparna
Mukhyamantri Chandru
Umashree
M. V. Vasudeva Rao
Mysore Lokesh

References

External links
 
 

1989 films
1980s Kannada-language films
Films directed by K. S. R. Das